Holly Jones may refer to:
 Holly Jones (murder victim) (died 2003), child murdered in Toronto
 Holly Jones (ecologist), American restoration ecologist and conservation biologist